Welcome to the World is the second and final Psycho Motel album, released in 1997. It features a different vocalist from the band's first album, 1995's State of Mind. In place of Hans Olav Solli is Andy Makin, whose "dark lyrics and distinctive vocal delivery" differentiate the album from its predecessor. It also features Scott Gorham of Thin Lizzy and Dave Murray of Iron Maiden as guest guitarists.

In 2006, Welcome to the World was re-released with two bonus tracks. These tracks contain Solli from the first album on vocals, and were probably recorded just before he left the band in 1997.

The bonus track "Wait" is the same released in the Japanese version of State of Mind (1995) named "(Can't) Wait". There is a demo track called "Winter's Child" that was recorded during the Welcome to the World sessions but was never released.

Track listing

Personnel
Andy Makin – vocals
Adrian Smith – guitar, backing vocals
Gary Liedeman – bass guitar
Mike Sturgis – drums
(Hans Olav) Solli – vocals on "Wait" and "Just Like a Woman"

Additional musicians
Dave Murray – guitars on "With You Again"
Scott Gorham – guitars on "I'm Alive"
Richard Cottle – keyboards
Martin Ditcham – percussion

Production
Simon Hanhart – producer, engineer, mixing
Ray Staff – mastering at Whitfield Street Studios, London
Tom Girling – assistant engineer

Other
Phil Nicholls – photography

References

1997 albums
Psycho Motel albums
Sanctuary Records albums